Kościuszko was a passenger steamship that was built in Scotland in 1915, sailed as a troopship in both World Wars, was an ocean liner between the wars, carried displaced persons after World War II and was scrapped in England in 1950.

In her 35-year history the ship was registered in the merchant navies of the United Kingdom, Latvia and Poland. She was built as Czaritza and later bore the names Lituania, Kościuszko, Gdynia and Empire Helford. The name Kościuszko refers to Tadeusz Kościuszko (1746 – 1817), a military leader, statesman and Polish national hero.

Construction
The Russian American Line ordered the ship before World War I to be an ocean liner to carry up to 1,000 passengers between New York and Arkhangelsk. Barclay, Curle & Co Ltd of Glasgow laid her keel in 1914, launched her as Czaritza on 14 February 1915 and completed her that May. Her yard number was 512.

She had twin four-cylinder quadruple-expansion engines driving twin screws.

First World War and Russian Civil War
She spent the remainder of the war as a troopship. She was evacuated from Russia during the Russian Civil War. Cunard Line bought her in 1917 and used her to carry troops between the USA and Europe and between the UK and Malta. In 1920 she returned to Arkhangelsk, this time with the Allied expeditionary forces intervening in the Russian Civil War.

Between the wars
The Russian American Line was a subsidiary of the Danish East Asiatic Company. In January 1921 the ship was transferred to another East Asiatic Company subsidiary, Baltic American Line, who renamed her Lituania. She worked various trans-oceanic routes, including a circular route  Halifax – New York – Copenhagen – Gdańsk – Liepāja.

In 1930 the East Asiatic Company sold Baltic American Line to Polish owners who renamed the company Polskie Transatlantyckie Towarzystwo Okrętowe ("Polish Transatlantic Shipping Company Limited" or PTTO) and renamed the ship Kościuszko. On 8 June she reached Gdynia, which became her port of registry on 20 June. She was operated by Gdynia America Line, at first with a mixed Polish and Danish crew, but from 1931 her crew was entirely Polish. She served on the Gdynia – Copenhagen – Halifax route, and also made short tourist cruises.

By 1938 she was equipped with wireless direction finding navigation equipment.

She started to work the Constanţa – Haifa route in 1935 and a route to South America in October 1936.

World War II
At the outbreak of World War II the Polish Navy requisitioned Kościuszko and evacuated her to Dartmouth in the UK before the Invasion of Poland. On 10 November 1939 she was commissioned as ORP Gdynia. Initially she was a troopship, but she was considered unsuitable for service at sea and served instead as a base ship in the UK. She housed a canteen, a hospital, a Naval NCO school and several other offices. In her naval service the ship was visited by, among others, Winston Churchill and King George VI. During a German air raid on Denver, Norfolk, on 25 September, she was hit by two aerial bombs, but swift action by the crew prevented the ship from catching fire.

On 30 June 1941 she was decommissioned, restored to Gdynia America Line and reverted to her name Kościuszko. She was placed under the management of the British Lamport and Holt Line, but was crewed entirely by Poles except for a Lamport and Holt liaison officer. She served as a troopship in the Indian Ocean and Malaya. Japanese aircraft attacked her several times. In 1943 a torpedo hit her but did not explode.

She was transferred to the Mediterranean and took part in the Allied Invasion of Sicily. Then she returned to Indian Ocean, this time as a part of United Maritime Authority.

After World War II
In 1945 the UK repatriated Batory to Poland but the crews of Kościuszko and another Gdynia America Line ship, Pułaski, refused to be repatriated. All crew members of both ships signed UK articles and the ships were transferred from Gdynia America Line to the UK Ministry of War Transport, who kept her under Lamport and Holt management. Kościuszkos port of registration was changed from Gdynia to London. Her call sign was changed to GLSW and she was given the UK official number 142335.

In April 1946 the MoWT renamed Kościuszko as Empire Helford and sold her to Lamport and Holt. She continued to serve as a troop transport and for transportation of displaced persons. In 1949 she was withdrawn from service, and on 2 May 1950 she reached Blyth, Northumberland to be scrapped.

Notes

Bibliography

External links
 
 Lamport and Holt Line

1915 ships
Allied intervention in the Russian Civil War
Auxiliary ships of Poland
Empire ships
Maritime incidents in September 1939
Ocean liners
Passenger ships of Latvia
Passenger ships of Russia
Passenger ships of Poland
Ships built on the River Clyde
Ships of the Lamport and Holt Line
Steamships of Latvia
Steamships of Poland
Steamships of Russia
Steamships of the United Kingdom
Troop ships of the United Kingdom
World War I merchant ships of the United Kingdom
World War I passenger ships of Russia
World War II naval ships of Poland
Ships of the Gdynia-America Line